Rankin Inlet (Inuktitut syllabics: ᑲᖏᕿᓂᖅ or Kangirliniq, ᑲᖏᖅᖠᓂᖅ, or Kangir&iniq meaning deep bay/inlet) is an Inuit hamlet on the Kudlulik Peninsula in Nunavut, Canada. It is the largest hamlet and second-largest settlement in Nunavut, after the territorial capital, Iqaluit. On the northwestern Hudson Bay, between Chesterfield Inlet and Arviat, it is the regional centre for the Kivalliq Region.

In the 1995 Nunavut capital plebiscite, Iqaluit defeated Rankin Inlet to become territorial capital of Nunavut.

History 

Archaeological sites suggest the area was inhabited around 1200 CE by Thule people who were bowhead whale hunters. By the late 18th century, they were succeeded by Caribou Inuit who hunted the inland barren-ground caribou, and fished for Arctic char along the coast, as well as the Diane River and Meliadine River. The Hudson's Bay Company (HBC) established itself throughout the bay in the 17th century, and after 1717, sloops from Churchill, Manitoba traded north to Rankin Inlet and beyond. It was surveyed by William Moor in 1747. HBC contact was followed in the mid-19th century by American and European whalers, who were followed by fur traders trapping Arctic foxes for their skins in the early 20th century, followed by missionaries who brought a written language system.

The town itself was founded by the owners of the Rankin Inlet Mine, just north of Johnston Cove. Starting in 1957, the mine produced nickel and copper ores from an underground operation. The mine was the first case of Inuit miners in Canada. When the mine closed in 1962, Rankin Inlet had a population of approximately 500 Inuit, and 70-80% had been mine workers. Several unsuccessful attempts followed to develop alternate sources of income for the town. These included a pig ranch in 1969 and a chicken-raising venture in the 1970s. Both animal groups were fed a diet of local fish, which gave the meat an unpleasant flavour. It was also common for the animals to freeze to death or be eaten by polar bears.

The Meliadine Gold Mine operated by Agnico Eagle opened in 2019 and is expected to produce until at least 2032. It is the second mine opened in the low Arctic, after the Meadowbank Gold Mine, and is both an underground and open-pit mine.

From 1985 to 1997, Kivalliq Hall operated as a boarding school for Inuit pupils; it had been recognized as a residential school for the pre-1995 period when it was operated by the Federal government.

Demographics 

Arts and culture 
Rankin Inlet is not only notable for its artists and artisans, it is recognized as housing the only Inuit fine-arts ceramics production facility in the world. Community artists work in a variety of media including ceramics, prints, bronze castings, carvings, watercolour and drawing. The Matchbox Gallery, founded in 1987, showcases art work and provides educational resources.

The community is served by Kivalliq News, a weekly newspaper which publishes in both English and Inuktitut.

The annual spring festival Pakallak Tyme includes a fishing competition and snowmobile races.

Services 
The community is served by the Rankin Inlet Airport, and by annual supply sealift. Groceries and household goods can be purchased at The North West Company's Northern Store or at the Kissarvik Cooperative.

There are two convenience stores, one being The Red Top Variety Shop, formally the Innukshuk Shop, and the other being Kativik True Value Hardware. Both are locally owned and operated.

There are several places to dine out which include The Captain's Galley (which is in the Siniktarvik Hotel), Turrarvik Inns North (Kissarvik Cooperative) and three Tim Hortons (in the Northern Store and two convenience stores) outlets.

There is an auto parts store called Rankin Auto Value. This store has automotive and heavy equipment parts, oils and tooling.

Broadband communications 

The community has been served by the Qiniq network since 2005. Qiniq is a fixed wireless service to homes and businesses, connecting to the outside world via a satellite backbone. The Qiniq network is designed and operated by SSi Canada. In 2017, the network was upgraded to 4G LTE technology, and 2G-GSM for mobile voice.

Lodging
Rankin Inlet has several hotels, including the Siniktarvik Hotel and Katimavik Suites.

Geography 
Rankin Inlet is notable for the chilling wind, severe winter storms, and water resources. The Diana River empties from the north into the hamlet's namesake inlet. The Kivalliq Region has several lakes, the largest being Nipissa Lake, and is flanked by two bays, Melvin Bay on the west and Prairie Bay on the east. Paniqtoq Peninsula, on the inlet's far western shore, provides a barrier shelter for the smaller Kivaliq Region. Dozens of islands dot the inlet, including Thomson Island, the largest, and the Barrier Islands, the longest chain. These natural resources attract tourists who hunt, fish, and canoe.

Climate
Rankin Inlet has a subarctic climate (Köppen climate classification Dfc), just short of a tundra climate. It is above the tree line. Temperatures stay below freezing from late September to early June. Although the climate is subarctic, temperatures rise and fall too rapidly and do not stay above  for long enough (30 days) for trees to grow.

Beginning on 16 January 2008, Rankin Inlet endured the longest recorded blizzard in Canada. This blizzard lasted 7 days 5 hours.

Notable people 

Jack Anawak, federal and territorial level Inuk politician
Levinia Brown, territorial level Inuk politician
Tagak Curley, Inuk politician and a prominent figure in the negotiations that led to the creation of Nunavut
Piita Irniq, Inuk politician and commissioner of Nunavut
Peter Ittinuar, first federal level Inuk politician
Victoria Kakuktinniq, Inuk fashion designer
Jose Kusugak, Inuk politician, president of Inuit Tapiriit Kanatami and Nunavut Tunngavik Incorporated, married to Nellie Kusugak
Lorne Kusugak, territorial level Inuk politician
Michael Kusugak, Inuk storyteller and children's writer
Nellie Kusugak, Inuk educator and commissioner of Nunavut, married to Jose Kusugak
Manitok Thompson, territorial level Inuk politician
John Tiktak, Inuk sculptor
Hunter Tootoo, former Minister of Fisheries, Oceans and the Canadian Coast Guard
Jordin Tootoo, former National Hockey League player

See also 
Canadian NORAD Region Forward Operating Location Rankin Inlet
Keewatin Air
List of municipalities in Nunavut

Notes

References

Further reading 

England JI. 1998. "Rankin Inlet Birthing Project: Outcome of Primipara Deliveries". International Journal of Circumpolar Health. 57: 113–5.
Igalaaq The Rankin Inlet Community Access Centre. Ottawa, Ont: Caledon Institute of Social Policy, 1999. 
Jansen, William Hugh. Eskimo Economics An Aspect of Culture Change at Rankin Inlet. Mercury series. Ottawa: National Museums of Canada, 1979.
Mallon, S. T. Inuktitut, Rankin Inlet Version. Yellowknife, N.W.T.: Dept. of Education, 1974.
Shirley, James R., and Darlene Wight. Rankin Inlet Ceramics. Winnipeg: Winnipeg Art Gallery, 2003. 
Watson, Linvill. Television Among Inuit of Keewatin The Rankin Inlet Experience. Saskatoon, [Sask.]: Institute for Northern Studies, University of Saskatoon, 1977.
Feeney, Mara. Rankin Inlet. Fiddletown: Gaby Press, 2009. .

External links

Mining communities in Nunavut
Populated places on Hudson Bay
Hamlets in the Kivalliq Region
Road-inaccessible communities of Nunavut